Lehna Singh Bhangi (died September 1797, his first name is alternatively spelt as Lahina or Lahna) was one of the triumvirate rulers of Lahore during the late 18th century. He was born into a Kahlon Jat family to a father named Dargaha. After a conflict with his biological father, he ran away from his home and came across Gurbakhsh Singh of the Bhangi Misl at the village of Roranwala. Gurbakhsh Singh, whom was without a male issue, adopted Lehna Singh. Later on 16 April 1765, alongside Gujjar Singh Bhangi of the Bhangi Misl and Sobha Singh of the Kahnhaiya Misl, they jointly attacked and conquered Lahore from the Afghan nominees Kabuli Mall and Amir Singh. They did not plunder the city after conquering it as it was the birthplace of Guru Ram Das, the fourth guru of the Sikhs. In December 1766, Ahmad Shah Durrani invaded the area and offered Lehna Singh governorship of the Punjab, which he declined. He and the two other sardars reoccupied the city of Lahore after Ahmad Shah left for Afghanistan. He ruled the city for 32 years until his death in September 1797.

See also 

 Sikh period in Lahore
 Indian campaign of Ahmad Shah Durrani

References 

History of Sikhism
People of the Sikh Empire
1797 deaths

Year of birth missing